Events from the year 1559 in art.

Events
Francesco Primaticcio and his assistants complete painting the Salle d'Hercule at the Palace of Fontainebleau (begun in the 1530s).
Sidsel Ulfstand and others complete the tapestry in the great hall of the Danish royal palace.

Works

 Pieter Bruegel the Elder
The Fight Between Carnival and Lent
Netherlandish Proverbs
 Luca Cambiaso – Resurrected Christ
 Titian
The Entombment
St Margaret and the Dragon

Births
January 26 - Francesco Bassano the Younger, painter (died 1592)
September 12 - Cigoli, Italian painter and architect of the late Mannerist period (died 1613)
date unknown
Francesco Cavazzoni, Italian painter and art historian (died 1612)
Orazio Farinati, Italian Mannerist painter (died 1616)
Domenico Passignano, Italian painter of a late-Renaissance or Counter-Maniera (Counter-Mannerism) style (died 1636)
Kanō Sanraku, Japanese painter (died 1635)
probable
Jan Vermeyen, Dutch goldsmith of the Renaissance Mannerism (died 1606)

Deaths
September 6 - Benvenuto Tisi (Il Garofalo), late-RenaissanceMannerist Italian painter of the School of Ferrara (born 1481)
November 5 - Kanō Motonobu, Japanese painter (born 1476)
date unknown
Giovanni da Nola, Italian sculptor and architect (born 1478)
Nicolas Denisot, French Renaissance poet and painter (born 1515)
Jan Cornelisz Vermeyen, Dutch Northern Renaissance painter (born 1500)
Wen Zhengming, Ming Dynasty painter, calligrapher, and scholar (born 1470)
probable - Juste de Juste, Franco-Italian sculptor and printmaker in etching (born 1505)

 
Years of the 16th century in art